Ben Reid (born 29 April 1989) is a former Australian rules footballer who played for Collingwood in the Australian Football League (AFL).

Personal life 
Reid grew up in Wangaratta Victoria, attending Galen Catholic College. He is the son of former Footscray and Carlton player, Bruce Reid.  His younger brother Sam Reid also plays AFL football for the Sydney Swans.

AFL career 
Reid was taken with Collingwood's first pick in the 2006 AFL Draft, pick number eight, and was handed the number 20 guernsey which was vacated by Chris Tarrant, after he was traded to the Fremantle Dockers. Reid made his Collingwood debut in Round 13, 2007 against Hawthorn, aged 18 years and 2 months. He was the youngest player in the AFL at the time.  Originally recruited as a forward, he is now recognised as one of the best key defenders in the game. He previously played for the Murray Bushrangers, Wangaratta Rovers and Bright Junior Football Club.

2010 
Prior to 2010 Reid had only played a cumulated total of 8 games from 2007 to 2009. 2010 would become his breakout year when he went on to play 21 games out of a possible 26. In round 12 he was nominated for the AFL Rising Star award, and went on to finish 10th overall. Reid played in both Grand Finals opposite St Kilda's Justin Koschitzke. In the Grand Final replay Reid suffered a leg injury, but wanted to play on and finish the game. It was later discovered that he had continued to play with a fractured fibula.

2011 
Reid continued his good form and was rewarded with selection in the 2011 All-Australian team in the centre half-back position and a seventh placing in the Copeland Trophy, Collingwood's best and fairest award.   However his season finished on a poor note, being well beaten by Tom Hawkins in the 2011 AFL Grand Final.  He had injured his groin in the lead up to the Qualifying Final, three weeks earlier.

Retirement 
Reid announced his retirement from AFL football in late 2020 after only managing two games for the season due to injury.

Statistics
 Statistics are correct to the end of the 2020 season

|- style="background-color: #eaeaea"
! scope="row" style="text-align:center" | 2007
|style="text-align:center;"|
| 20 || 3 || 2 || 4 || 20 || 3 || 23 || 15 || 2 || 0.7 || 1.3 || 6.7 || 1.0 || 7.7 || 5.0 || 0.7
|- 
! scope="row" style="text-align:center" | 2008
|style="text-align:center;"|
| 20 || 3 || 0 || 2 || 14 || 9 || 23 || 9 || 4 || 0.0 || 0.7 || 4.7 || 3.0 || 7.7 || 3.0 || 1.3
|- style="background-color: #eaeaea"
! scope="row" style="text-align:center" | 2009
|style="text-align:center;"|
| 20 || 2 || 1 || 1 || 10 || 5 || 15 || 5 || 4 || 0.5 || 0.5 || 5.0 || 2.5 || 7.5 || 2.5 || 2.0
|- 
! scope="row" style="text-align:center" | 2010
|style="text-align:center;"|
| 20 || 21 || 0 || 0 || 193 || 105 || 298 || 119 || 26 || 0.0 || 0.0 || 9.2 || 5.0 || 14.2 || 5.7 || 1.2
|- style="background-color: #eaeaea"
! scope="row" style="text-align:center" | 2011
|style="text-align:center;"|
| 20 || 24 || 1 || 0 || 241 || 129 || 370 || 161 || 24 || 0.0 || 0.0 || 10.0 || 5.4 || 15.4 || 6.7 || 1.0
|- 
! scope="row" style="text-align:center" | 2012
|style="text-align:center;"|
| 20 || 20 || 1 || 1 || 181 || 103 || 284 || 110 || 28 || 0.1 || 0.1 || 9.1 || 5.2 || 14.2 || 5.5 || 1.4
|- style="background-color: #eaeaea"
! scope="row" style="text-align:center" | 2013
|style="text-align:center;"|
| 20 || 22 || 25 || 11 || 201 || 129 || 330 || 135 || 34 || 1.1 || 0.5 || 9.1 || 5.9 || 15.0 || 6.1 || 1.5
|- 
! scope="row" style="text-align:center" | 2014
|style="text-align:center;"|
| 20 || 4 || 1 || 1 || 19 || 9 || 28 || 9 || 4 || 0.3 || 0.3 || 4.8 || 2.3 || 7.0 || 2.3 || 1.0
|- style="background-color: #eaeaea"
! scope="row" style="text-align:center" | 2015
|style="text-align:center;"|
| 20 || 5 || 6 || 2 || 42 || 28 || 70 || 24 || 7 || 1.2 || 0.4 || 8.4 || 5.6 || 14.0 || 4.8 || 1.4
|- 
! scope="row" style="text-align:center" | 2016
|style="text-align:center;"|
| 20 || 17 || 0 || 0 || 209 || 87 || 296 || 136 || 16 || 0 || 0 || 12.3 || 5.1 || 17.4 || 8.0 || 0.9
|- style="background-color: #eaeaea"
! scope="row" style="text-align:center" | 2017
|style="text-align:center;"|
| 20 || 15 || 14 || 13 || 155 || 53 || 208 || 94 || 18 || 0.9 || 0.9 || 10.3 || 3.5 || 13.9 || 6.3 || 1.2
|- 
! scope="row" style="text-align:center" | 2018
|style="text-align:center;"|
| 20 || 6 || 8 || 6 || 52 || 17 || 69 || 34 || 7 || 1.3 || 1.0 || 8.7 || 2.8 || 11.5 || 5.7 || 1.2
|- style="background-color: #eaeaea"
! scope="row" style="text-align:center" | 2019
|style="text-align:center;"|
| 20 || 8 || 11 || 7 || 45 || 32 || 77 || 27 || 9 || 1.4 || 0.9 || 5.6 || 4.0 || 9.6 || 3.4 || 1.1
|- 
! scope="row" style="text-align:center" | 2020
|style="text-align:center;"|
| 20 || 2 || 3 || 0 || 7 || 4 || 11 || 3 || 1 || 1.5 || 0.0 || 3.5 || 2.0 || 5.5 || 1.5 || 0.5
|- class="sortbottom"
! colspan=3| Career
! 152
! 73
! 48
! 1389
! 713
! 2102
! 881
! 185
! 0.5
! 0.3
! 9.1
! 4.7
! 13.8
! 5.8
! 1.2
|}

References

External links

 

Living people
1989 births
Collingwood Football Club players
Collingwood Football Club Premiership players
People from Wangaratta
Australian rules footballers from Victoria (Australia)
Murray Bushrangers players
Wangaratta Rovers Football Club players
All-Australians (AFL)
Cooperative advocates
One-time VFL/AFL Premiership players